Hyper-interactive teaching technology or H-ITT is a form of technology used primarily to interact between the students and teachers.  Students generally are given an H-ITT transmitter, which is similar to a remote control, which allows them to answer questions in poll or quiz form.

It also means that the interaction between the teacher, the students and among the students is very high. The term is frequently used to denote a constant conversation among the students themselves, and learning with each other, which is not usually the case in a conventional teaching medium.

Educational technology